Plana Alta is a comarca in the province of Castelló in the Valencian Country (Spain). The largest town in the comarca is Castelló de la Plana, which is also the capital and largest town in the province.

Municipalities 
The comarca comprises 17 municipalities, listed below with their populations at the 2001 and 2011 Censuses and according to the latest official estimates:

See also
Geography of Spain
List of Spanish cities

References

 
Comarques of the Valencian Community
Geography of the Province of Castellón